Oxyopes hindostanicus is a species of spider of the genus Oxyopes. It is found in India, Pakistan and Sri Lanka.

See also
 List of Oxyopidae species

References

External links
Description of Two New Species of The Genus Oxyopes (Araneae: Oxyopidae) From Punjab, Pakistan

Oxyopidae
Spiders of Asia
Spiders described in 1901